The House of Clam-Martinic is the name of an old and influential noble family, whose family members occupied many important positions within the Habsburg Empire.

History 
It was established when Carl Josef, Count of Clam, a member of the old Austrian noble family Clam, married Maria Anna, Imperial Countess of Martinic (z Martinicz or Martinicové in Czech), a member of an old Czech Bohemian noble family claimed to be descended from the Vršovci family.

The family originates from Berg near Henndorf am Wallersee and appeared under the name Berger or Perger. Around 1209 a Carinthian branch owned Höhenbergen castle near Völkermarkt. In 1524, the family acquired Clam Castle in Upper Austria, which to this day is owned by the family.

Prominent members
 Karl Clam-Martinic (1792-1840), Austrian statesman and lieutenant field marshal.
Jindřich Jaroslav Clam-Martinic (1826–1887), also known as Heinrich Jaroslav, Count of Clam-Martinic, Bohemian politician
Richard, Count of Clam-Martinic (1832-1891), Geheimrat, Order of the Golden Fleece
Heinrich Clam-Martinic (1863–1932), Austrian statesman and prime minister
Georg Clam-Martinic (1908–2000), Austrian author and engineer

References

German Bohemian noble families
Bohemian noble families
Austrian noble families